The 2016 Ju-Jitsu World Championship were the 14th edition of the Ju-Jitsu World Championships, and were held in Wrocław, Poland from November 25 to November 27, 2016.

Schedule 
25.11.2016 – Men's and Women's Fighting System, Men's and Women's Jiu-Jitsu (ne-waza), Women's Duo System – Classic, Mixed Duo System – Show
26.11.2016 – Men's and Women's Fighting System, Men's Duo System – Classic, Women's Duo System – Show
27.11.2016 – Men's Duo System – Show, Mixed Duo System – Classic, Team event

European Ju-Jitsu

Fighting System

Men's events

Women's events

Duo System

Duo Classic events

Duo Show events

Brazilian Jiu-Jitsu

Men's events

Women's events

Team event

Links

References

External links
Official results (PDF)